GamesMaster was a monthly multi-format computer and video game magazine published by Future plc in the United Kingdom. As of 2012, it was the biggest selling multi-format video games magazine in the United Kingdom, outselling its partner publication Edge. Along with partner magazine GamesTM, it ceased print in November 2018. It was originally launched to complement the television show GamesMaster.

History
The magazine was launched in January 1993, to complement the television show of the same name. While the show later ceased broadcasting, the magazine continued, outlasting the show by 20 years.

The magazine published a number of reviews and previews of games; however this covered only half of the magazine as it also included latest gaming news, posters, letters from readers and monthly competitions. The popularity of the magazine grew and game producers sought to achieve the elusive GamesMaster “Gold Award” for a reference on their package. The Gold Award was awarded to games that scored 90% or higher.

GamesMaster Philippines
The Philippine publishing house Summit Media started a local edition of GamesMaster in September 2003. Each issue was initially priced at PhP95.00 (around US$2.06 or £1.27 as of December 2009), but later issues were priced at PhP100 (around US$2.17 or £1.34 as of December 2009). The edition quickly gained popularity with the local community because of its affordable price and extensive coverage of the Filipino gaming scene. GamesMaster Philippines ceased publication in September 2006 due to a corporate restructuring. Games and tech journalist Ed Geronia became the magazine's Editor-in-Chief with Jaykee Evangelista as its art director.

GamesMaster in Arabic
Between 1996 and 1999, a Lebanese publishing house republished the British version after a literal translation to Arabic.

Despite the very low quality in translation, the magazine sold well due to the huge demand from Arab video gamers which wasn't fulfilled with any real publication from the region. Each issue was priced for 25 Riyals/Durhams and it sold out almost the same day it reached bookshops.

References

External links
Golden Joystick Awards
Archived GamesMaster magazines on the Internet Archive

1993 establishments in the United Kingdom
2018 disestablishments in the United Kingdom
Defunct magazines published in the United Kingdom
Magazines established in 1993
Magazines disestablished in 2018
Mass media in Bath, Somerset
Monthly magazines published in the United Kingdom
Video game magazines published in the United Kingdom